Shaq Fu is a 2D fighting game published by Electronic Arts for the Sega Genesis and Super NES on October 28, 1994. It was developed by the now-defunct Delphine Software International. Versions for the Game Gear, Game Boy, and Amiga followed in 1995. Former professional basketball player Shaquille O'Neal stars as the player character.

Shaq Fu was met with mixed responses from critics upon release, though it has since come to be considered one of the worst video games ever made. A sequel, Shaq Fu: A Legend Reborn, was released in 2018.

Plot
In the game's storyline, Shaquille O'Neal walks into a dojo while heading to a charity basketball game in Tokyo, Japan. After speaking with Leotsu, a martial arts master, Shaq goes to another dimension, the Second World, where he must rescue a young boy named Nezu from the evil mummy Sett Ra.

Ports

The Genesis version of Shaq Fu has five more playable characters (Auroch, Colonel, Diesel, Leotsu, and Nezu) and three more stages (The Lab, The Wasteland, and Yasko Mines) than the Super NES version, thus the Genesis version has a longer story mode. The North Gate/South Gate stage is accessible in the SNES version with a cheat code, whereas the Genesis version has the North Gate/South Gate stage available by default. The Amiga version contains the same content as the Genesis version (it keeps the text "Licensed by Sega Enterprises, LTD" left over from that version on the title screen), though the backgrounds have no animation. It also only has three tunes; there is no background music during the fights.

The Game Boy version has the same seven characters as the Super NES version, whereas the Game Gear version only has six characters (Shaq, Leotsu, Mephis, Rajah, Kaori, and Sett Ra). Both the Game Boy and Game Gear versions lack a tournament mode and in-game voices.

Both the Genesis and SNES versions of the game contained a hidden button sequence that would initiate a "blood code" in the spirit of Mortal Kombat. The blood effects were subdued and minor which kept the game at its "MA-13" (known by modern rating standard as "T") rating. However, the blood code gave access to finishing moves within the game that were triggered by striking the opponent in a certain way to end the match. The finishing moves were not gory as those depicted in the fatalities of Mortal Kombat but were considerably more violent when performed against monster-type characters in the game, rather than humans. Some of the finishing moves that have been discovered include the following examples:
 Sett Ra, when struck with a high attack toward his head, would drop to his knees as his head caught fire. The body of Sett Ra would then dissolve, the wraps falling to the ground and the smoldering shoulder armor tumbling forward.
 Mephis, when struck with a mid-range attack, would shatter into ghost-like shards which fade away into the air, leaving his decrepit robe behind.
 Genesis-exclusive character Auroch would turn to stone and explode if struck with a mid-range attack.

Reception

Shaq Fu received mixed reviews at the time of its release. GamePro gave the SNES version a positive review, saying that the unusually small size of the sprites is balanced out by the incredibly fast game speed. They also praised the "ultra sharp" controls and impressive digitized graphics. They reviewed the Genesis version as superior to the SNES version due to its additional characters and improved controls, and concluded that the game is "fun once you get used to the small, fast sprites". One Electronic Gaming Monthly reviewer scored the game as a 6/10, while another gave it a 4/10. It received a grade of D from Entertainment Weekly. GamesMaster gave the Genesis and SNES versions 81% and 83% respectively. Mean Machines Sega Magazine gave the Genesis version 79%. Next Generation reviewed the Genesis version of the game, rating it two stars out of five, and stated that "Shaq Fu includes everything a good fighting game needs, with the exception of good fighting". In contrast to their positive reactions to the SNES and Genesis versions, GamePro panned the Game Boy release, saying it dumbs down the gameplay, loses so much graphical detail that the characters are unrecognizable, and makes the music far too pervasive.

Retrospective criticism of the game has been generally negative. GameTrailers rated it number 4 Worst in their "Top Ten Best and Worst Video Games". In the September 1997, Nintendo Power had 12 staff members vote in a list for the top 100 games of all time. This list also included a 10 worst games of all-time list voted by the staff, which placed Shaq Fu at 3rd worst place on their list. The article stated that it was "not possible to come up with a worse idea than this". The same year, Electronic Gaming Monthly ranked it number 10 on their "Top 10 Worst Games of All Time". In response to the negative feedback to the game, Levi Buchanan from IGN stated it was undeserved as a result of collective exaggerations.

Popular YouTuber the Angry Video Game Nerd reviewed this game during an episode themed after A Christmas Carol, in which the Nerd witnesses his present self playing the game, and of course, heavily panning it.

Sequel

A sequel, Shaq Fu: A Legend Reborn, was released on June 5, 2018 for Microsoft Windows, Nintendo Switch, PlayStation 4, Xbox One, iOS and Android.

See also
Barkley Shut Up and Jam!
Michael Jordan: Chaos in the Windy City
Slam City with Scottie Pippen

References

External links

1994 video games
Amiga games
Amiga 1200 games
Electronic Arts games
Delphine Software International games
Game Boy games
Game Gear games
Sega Genesis games
Super Nintendo Entertainment System games
Video games developed in France
Shaquille O'Neal
Video games set in Tokyo
Sports fiction
Multiplayer and single-player video games
Fighting games
Video games based on real people
Cultural depictions of basketball players
Tiertex Design Studios games
Ocean Software games
Video games featuring black protagonists
Black Pearl Software games